Robert Axi was an English politician who was MP for Bletchingley in 1417. In the History of Parliament Online biography (which is actually an online reprint of the entry that appeared in the 1993 book The History of Parliament: the House of Commons 1386–1421, edited by three people, including the historian J. S. Roskell who was a Fellow of the British Academy) has only one word: "unidentified".

References

English MPs 1417
15th-century English politicians
People from Tandridge (district)